The Institute of Ocean Sciences is operated by Fisheries and Oceans Canada and is one of the largest marine research centres in Canada.  It is located on Patricia Bay and the former British Columbia Highway 17A in Sidney, British Columbia on Vancouver Island just west of Victoria International Airport.

References
Fisheries and Oceans Canada: IOS
Science & Technology for Canadians: IOS

Canadian federal government buildings
Buildings and structures in British Columbia
Research institutes in Canada
Oceanographic organizations
Biological research institutes
Saanich Peninsula
Southern Vancouver Island
Fisheries and aquaculture research institutes
Fisheries and Oceans Canada
Science and technology in Canada